Hubertus or Hubert ( 656 – 30 May 727 A.D.) was a Christian saint who became the first bishop of Liège in 708 A.D. He is the patron saint of hunters, mathematicians, opticians and metalworkers. Known as the "Apostle of the Ardennes", he was called upon, until the early 20th century, to cure rabies through the use of the traditional Saint Hubert's Key.

Hubert was widely venerated during the Middle Ages. The iconography of his legend is entangled with the legend of the martyr Saint Eustace. The Bollandists published seven early lives of Hubertus (Acta Sanctorum, November 3, 759 – 930 A.D.); the first of these was the work of a contemporary, although it offers few details.

Hubertus died 30 May 727 A.D. in or near a place called (in Latin) Fura. In the later Middle Ages, this location was claimed to have been identified as Tervuren near Brussels; recent scholarship, however, considers Voeren (Fourons), a location much closer to Liège than Brussels, to be the saint's likelier resting place. His feast day is 3 November.

His other skills were in mathematics and metalwork.

Early life
Hubert likely was born in Toulouse about the year 656, the eldest son of  Bertrand, allegedly a Duke of Aquitaine.
At the age of 10 he nearly died from a fever. As a youth, Hubert was sent to the Neustrian court of Theuderic III at Paris, where his charm and agreeable address led to his investment with the dignity of  "count of the palace". Meanwhile, the tyrannical conduct of Ebroin, mayor of the Neustrian palace (in office: 658 to ), caused a general emigration of the nobles and others to the court of Austrasia at Metz. Like many nobles of the time, Hubert was a hunting enthusiast.

About this time (682), Hubert married Floribanne, daughter of Dagobert,  Count of Leuven. Hubert soon followed his noble peers to the Austrasian court and was warmly welcomed by Pepin of Herstal, Mayor of the palace, who entitled him almost immediately Grand Master of the household.

Spiritual conversion

Hubert's wife died giving birth to their son Floribert, and his grief prompted him to retreat from the court. He withdrew into the forests of the Ardennes and gave himself up entirely to hunting.

Legend holds that on a Good Friday morning, while the faithful were in church, Hubert was hunting in the forest. As he pursued a magnificent stag or hart, the animal turned and Hubert was astounded to see a crucifix floating between its antlers. He heard a voice saying: "Hubert unless thou turnest to the Lord and leadest a holy life, thou shalt quickly go down into Hell." Hubert dismounted and prostrated himself, and after asking "Lord, what wouldst Thou have me do?" is told, "Go and seek Lambert, and he will instruct you."

The story of the stag first appears in one of the later legendary hagiographies (Bibliotheca hagiographic Latina, nos. 3994–4002) and has been appropriated from the legend of Saint Eustace or Placidus. It was only attributed to Saint Hubert in the 15th century.

Hubert is honored among sport hunters as the originator of ethical hunting behavior. In some versions of the story, the stag is said to have lectured Hubert to hold animals in higher regard and have compassion for them as God's creatures with value in their own right. For example, the hunter ought to only shoot when a clean, quick, and therefore humane kill is assured. He ought to shoot only old stags which are past their prime breeding years and forego a much-anticipated shot on a trophy to instead euthanize a sick or injured animal that might appear on the scene. Further, one ought never to shoot a female with young in tow, to assure the young deer have a mother to guide them to food during the winter. Such is the legacy of Hubert, which is still taught today and who held in high regard in the extensive, rigorous German and Austrian hunter education courses.

His legacy is also followed by the French chasse à courre (riding to hounds) masters, huntsmen, and followers who hunt deer, boar, and roe on horseback and are the last direct heirs of Hubert in Europe. Chasse à course is currently enjoying a revival in France. These hunters apply a specific set of ethics, rituals, rules, and tactics that date from the early Middle Ages. Hubert is venerated every year by the hunts in formal ceremonies.

Religious career

Hubert set out immediately for Maastricht, to meet Lambert, a bishop who received him kindly and became his spiritual director. Hubert renounced all his very considerable honors and gave up his birthright to the Aquitaine to his younger brother, Odo, whom he made guardian of his infant son, Floribert. Having distributed all his personal wealth among the poor, he studied for the priesthood, was ordained, and soon afterward became one of St. Lambert's chief associates in the administration of his diocese. By the advice of St. Lambert, Hubert made a pilgrimage to Rome in 708, but during his absence, Lambert was assassinated by the followers of Pepin. According to the hagiographies of Hubert, this act was simultaneously revealed to the pope in a vision, together with an injunction to appoint Hubert bishop of Maastricht.

Hubert distributed his episcopal revenues among the poor, was diligent in fasting and prayer, and became well known for his eloquence in the pulpit. In 720, in obedience to a vision, Hubert translated St. Lambert's remains from Maastricht to Liège with great pomp and ceremony, with several neighboring bishops assisting. A basilica for the relics was built upon the site of Lambert's martyrdom, and was consecrated as a cathedral the following year, the see being removed from Maastricht to Liège, then only a small village. This laid the foundation of the future greatness of Liège, of which Lambert is honored as patron, and Hubert as founder and first bishop.

Hubert actively evangelized among pagans in the extensive Ardennes forests and in Toxandria, a district stretching from near Tongeren to the confluence of the rivers Waal and the Rhine.

Death 
Hubertus died peacefully in a place called Fura, located 30 miles from Liège, 30 May 727 or 728. Initially he was buried in the collegiate St. Peter's Church, Liège, but his bones were dug out from the ground and translated to the Benedictine Abbey of Amdain ("Andagium", in French "Andage", the present-day Saint-Hubert, Belgium) in the Ardennes in 825. The abbey became a locus for pilgrimages, until Hubert's coffin disappeared during the Reformation. His feast day is 3 November, probably the date of the translation of his relics to Amdain.

Veneration
Hubert was widely venerated in the Middle Ages and partly because of his noble birth, several military orders were named after him: the Bavarian, the Bohemian International Order of St. Hubertus and that of the Archbishop-Elector of Cologne.

Hubertus, along with Quirinus of Neuss, Cornelius and Anthony, was venerated as one of the Four Holy Marshals (Vier Marschälle Gottes) in the Rhineland.
 The St. Hubertus Orden (Order of Saint Hubert), a chivalric order, was founded in 1444 by Gerhard V of Jülich and Berg.

In the Anglican Communion, at least two churches were dedicated to Saint Hubertus within the Church of England.

Patronage
St. Hubert of Liège is patron of archers; dogs; forest workers; trappers; hunting and huntsmen; mathematicians; metal workers; smelters and the city of Liège.

St. Hubert has been described as the patron saint of hunters and is honored by sportsmen as the originator of ethical hunting behavior. However, he renounced hunting after having his vision encountering the stag, as it was believed that God had seen his hunting life as an unholy, idolatrous one which would lead him to Hell. According to the Jews in the Middle Ages, when St. Hubert became a priest, clergy were subsequently forbidden to hunt and if they did, would be required to take penance.

God's call to Hubertus made him realize that hunting had distracted him from fulfilling his religious duties on Easter's Good Friday.

Lambert sent Hubert to the Ardennes to live amongst the people and the forest creatures. Hubert studied to become a priest and was soon ordained. Following Lamberts's assassination, Hubert becomes Bishop of Maastricht, then of Liége. He was known as the Apostle of the Ardennes throughout his life, venturing much into the forest and gaining the trust (and the faith) of its people through the outdoorsman skills he acquired in his hunting life. Hubert becomes a sought reference and voice whenever matters of the forest are on the table.

Gallery

See also 

 Chronological list of saints in the 8th century
 Jägermeister
 Saint Eustace
 St. Hubert's hound

Notes

External links

 Painting from the National Gallery, London The Conversion of Saint Hubert

650s births
727 deaths
8th-century Frankish bishops
8th-century Frankish saints
Bishops of Liège
Saint-Hubert, Belgium
Medieval Belgian saints
7th-century Frankish people
Animals in Christianity